"Angel Eyes" is a song by the English rock band Roxy Music. It was released in August 1979 as the third single from their sixth studio album Manifesto (1979), and peaked at No. 4 in the UK.

The single was a disco re-recorded version of the album track, which was more in a rock vein, and (just like the previous single "Dance Away") was also released as an extended 12" dance mix (still a relatively new format at that time). The single version of "Angel Eyes" later replaced the album version for subsequent releases. The album version was first re-released on The Thrill of It All (1995) box set. The 1999 re-mastered version of the Manifesto album finally restored the original version of the song.
The single re-recording of the song omits the last verse.

Coincidentally, the song was in the UK top 20 at the same time as another song called "Angeleyes" by the Swedish group ABBA.

"Angel Eyes" was also the first record for which Roxy Music made a specific music video.

Track listing
 12" single (POSPX 67)
"Angel Eyes" – 6:39
"My Little Girl" – 3:08

 7" single (POSP 67)
"Angel Eyes" – 3:08
"My Little Girl" – 3:08

Personnel
Musicians
 Bryan Ferry – lead vocals, keyboards
 Andy Mackay – oboe, saxophone
 Phil Manzanera – electric guitar
 Gary Tibbs – bass guitar
 Paul Carrack – keyboards
 Paul Thompson – drums
 Fiona Hibbert – harp

Charts

Weekly charts

Year-end charts

Certifications

References

External links
 

1979 songs
1979 singles
Roxy Music songs
Songs written by Bryan Ferry
Songs written by Andy Mackay
Polydor Records singles
Atco Records singles
E.G. Records singles